Changyang may refer to the following places in China:

 Changyang Tujia Autonomous County, Hubei province
 Changyang Railway Station, in the above county
 Changyang Station, of Beijing Subway
 Changyang Town (:zh:长阳镇), in Fangshan District of Beijing